Antroporidae is a family of bryozoans belonging to the order Cheilostomatida.

Genera:
 Antropora Norman, 1903
 Lateroflustrella d'Orbigny, 1853
 Parantropora Tilbrook, 1998
 Rosseliana Jullien, 1888
 Samudraka Guha, 1989

References

Bryozoan families